Millsfield is a township in Coös County, New Hampshire, United States. It is part of the Berlin, NH–VT Micropolitan Statistical Area. The population was 25 at the 2020 census.

In New Hampshire, locations, grants, townships (which are different from towns), and purchases are unincorporated portions of a county which are not part of any town and have limited self-government (if any, as many are uninhabited).

History 
It was named in honor of Sir Thomas Mills. In 1952, Millsfield was organized for voting purposes.

Geography
Millsfield Pond is in the center of the township. The outlet, Millsfield Pond Brook, flows northeast to Clear Stream at the eastern boundary of the township. Clear Stream, which crosses the northeast corner of the township, is an east-flowing tributary of the Androscoggin River. The southeast part of the township also drains to the Androscoggin River, via Newell Brook and the outlet of Moose Pond. The southwest part of the township is drained by Phillips Brook, a south-flowing tributary of the Upper Ammonoosuc River and part of the Connecticut River watershed.

Millsfield is bordered to the west by Erving's Location and Odell, to the north by Dixville, to the east by Errol, and to the south by Dummer.

New Hampshire Route 26 crosses the northeast part of Millsfield, following Clear Stream. To the northwest it leads over Dixville Notch to Colebrook, while to the southeast it leads into Errol and then continues to the Maine border. Millsfield has the only road that leads to Erving's Location, an uninhabited township.

Politics
New Hampshire law allows towns with fewer than 100 residents to open the polls at midnight and close them as soon as all registered voters have cast their ballots.  Beginning in 2016, Millsfield became the third town in New Hampshire with midnight voting.

Election results
Boldfaced names indicate the ultimate nationwide winner of each contest:

2016

In July 2016 residents voted to seek incorporation as a town. Legislative action will be required to implement this process.

2020

Demographics

As of the 2000 census, there were 22 people, 8 households, and 5 families residing in the township. The population density was 0.5 people per square mile (0.2/km2). There were 62 housing units at an average density of 1.4 per square mile (0.5/km2). The racial makeup of the township was 100.00% White.

There were 8 households, out of which 12.5% (one) had children under the age of 18 living with them, 37.5% (three) were married couples living together, 25.0% (two) had a female householder with no husband present, and 37.5% (three) were non-families. 37.5% (three) of all households were made up of individuals, and 25.0% had someone living alone who was 65 years of age or older. The average household size was 2.75 and the average family size was 3.80.

In the township the population was spread out, with 13.6% (three) under the age of 18, 9.1% (two) from 18 to 24, 22.7% (five) from 25 to 44, 9.1% (two) from 45 to 64, and 45.5% (10) who were 65 years of age or older. The median age was 52 years. For every 100 females, there were 37.5 males. For every 100 females age 18 and over, there were 46.2 males.

The median income for a household in the township was $59,375, and the median income for a family was $59,375. Males had a median income of $38,750 versus $0 for females. The per capita income for the township was $13,063. None of the population or the families were below the poverty line.

See also
Dixville Notch, New Hampshire
Hart's Location, New Hampshire

References

Townships in Coös County, New Hampshire
Berlin, New Hampshire micropolitan area
Townships in New Hampshire